Colonel
Sir Charles Edward Yate, 1st Baronet,  (28 August 1849 – 29 February 1940) was an English soldier and administrator in British India and later a politician in Britain.

Early life
Yate was born at Holme-on-Spalding-Moor, Yorkshire, the son of the village's vicar. He was educated at Shrewsbury School and Rossall School and in 1867 purchased an Ensigncy in the 49th Foot.

Military career
In 1871 he was promoted Lieutenant and transferred to the Bombay Staff Corps of the Indian Army and later to the Indian Political Service, serving as an assistant political superintendent in Rajputana.

He was promoted Captain in 1879 and commanded a detachment of the 29th Bombay Infantry during the Second Afghan War, 1879–1880. He then served on General Roberts's staff and served as political officer in charge of Kandahar from August 1880 until May 1881. From 1884 to 1886 he served with the Afghan Boundary Commission. In March 1885, he found himself at the epicentre of a global crisis when he was the most senior British officer to witness the Panjdeh incident which almost led to war between Britain and Russia. For his work with the Commission, he was appointed Companion of the Order of the Star of India (CSI) in 1887 and Companion of the Order of St Michael and St George (CMG) in 1888, being promoted Major between these two awards. He was also awarded the Afghan Order of Hurmat.

During this time, Yate was a supporter of the Pashtun colonisation of northern Afghanistan, writing in 1893 that "[i]t is only the non-Afghan tribes such as the Maimanah Uzbegs [Uzbeks], the Herati Hazarahs and Jamshidis, etc. that have any intercourse or communication with the Turkomans or Russians, and once encircled by Afghans they are safe."

In 1889 he was appointed British political agent in Muscat, in 1890 consul at Muscat, then political agent in Baluchistan, and in 1893 agent to the Governor-General to Khorasan and Sistan, based in Mashhad, Persia. He was promoted Lieutenant-Colonel in 1893 and consul-general in 1896. In 1898 he returned to Rajputana and in 1900 was appointed Chief Commissioner of Baluchistan. He was promoted Colonel in 1901, and retired from the Indian Political Service in 1904 and the Indian Army in 1906.

During the First World War, he returned to service with the British Army, attached to No 1 Ambulance Flotilla, which transported casualties from the Western Front on the River Seine, in 1915.

Political career
He returned to England in 1904.  He stood unsuccessfully as a Conservative for Parliament at Pontefract in 1906, and for Melton, Leicestershire in January 1910 before being elected to the latter seat as Member of Parliament in December 1910. He served until 1924.

Yate was created a Baronet, of Madeley Hall in the County of Shropshire, for his political service in the 1921 New Year Honours.

Later years
It was to Madeley he moved after retiring from Parliament, having previously lived at Asfordby House near Melton. He became J.P. for the Borough of Wenlock in 1927.

His only son died in childhood in 1910 (although he also had two daughters), and so the baronetcy became extinct upon his death, at Madeley Hall, aged ninety.  Although he lost his speech in older age, he remained mentally alert enough to still take an interest in news from India. He was buried at St Michael's Parish Churchyard in Madeley.

Footnotes

References
Biography, Oxford Dictionary of National Biography

1849 births
1940 deaths
People from Holme-on-Spalding-Moor
People educated at Shrewsbury School
People educated at Rossall School
49th Regiment of Foot officers
British Indian Army officers
Chief Commissioners of Baluchistan
Baronets in the Baronetage of the United Kingdom
Companions of the Order of the Star of India
Companions of the Order of St Michael and St George
Conservative Party (UK) MPs for English constituencies
UK MPs 1910–1918
UK MPs 1918–1922
UK MPs 1922–1923
UK MPs 1923–1924
British military personnel of the Second Anglo-Afghan War
Bombay Staff Corps officers
Indian Political Service officers